USS LST-478 was a United States Navy  used in the Asiatic-Pacific Theater during World War II.

Construction
LST-478 was laid down on 17 August 1942, under Maritime Commission (MARCOM) contract, MC hull 998, by  Kaiser Shipyards, Yard No. 4, Richmond, California; launched on 7 November 1942, sponsored by Mrs. Ray Humphrey; and commissioned on 13 March 1943.

Service history
During the war, LST-478 was assigned to the Asiatic-Pacific Theater. She took part in the Gilbert Islands operation November and December 1943; the Battle of Hollandia in April 1944; the Battle of Guam in July 1944; the Battle of Leyte landing in October 1944; and the Battle of Okinawa in April 1945.

Post-war service
Following the war, LST-478 performed occupation duty in the Far East until mid-March 1946. Upon her return to the United States and was decommissioned on 23 March 1946, and struck from the Navy list on 28 August 1947. On 25 March 1948, the ship was sold to the Consolidated Builders, Inc., Seattle, Washington, and subsequently scrapped.

Honors and awards
LST-478 earned five battle stars for her World War II service.

Notes 

Citations

Bibliography 

Online resources

External links

 

LST-1-class tank landing ships
World War II amphibious warfare vessels of the United States
Ships built in Richmond, California
1942 ships
S3-M2-K2 ships